Peroxide is the debut album by Scottish singer-songwriter Nina Nesbitt. The album features new material and old songs from her past EPs. It was released on 17 February 2014. After the release of the album, Nesbitt embarked on a 3-show tour including Manchester, London, and her hometown of Edinburgh. The album was produced by Nesbitt with Jake Gosling (Paloma Faith, Ed Sheeran, One Direction) and Iain Archer (Example, Snow Patrol, Jake Bugg).

Despite being at number one on Wednesday's mid-week chart, with a small lead, following the Brit Awards that night giving coverage to other bands and singers, including Arctic Monkeys and Bastille, it only reached number 11 on the album chart on Sunday, 23 February. However, in Nesbitt's native Scotland, the album entered at number one on the Scottish Albums Chart, selling 45% more than its nearest competitor.

Track listing

Charts

Release history

References

2014 debut albums
Nina Nesbitt albums
Albums produced by Jake Gosling
Island Records albums